Sebestyén Schmidt (3 February 1901 – 13 September 1971) was a Hungarian cyclist. He competed in the individual road race event at the 1932 Summer Olympics.

References

External links
 

1901 births
1971 deaths
Hungarian male cyclists
Olympic cyclists of Hungary
Cyclists at the 1932 Summer Olympics
Place of birth missing